David Burke (February 27, 1962) is an American chef and restaurateur, known for his appearance on the reality TV program Iron Chef America.

Early  life
David Burke was born in Brooklyn NY and raised in Hazlet, New Jersey

A graduate of the Culinary Institute of America and a student at Ecole Lenotre Pastry School in Plaisir, France. Burke worked with legendary chefs in France and New York such as Pierre Troisgros, George Blanc, Marc Meneau, Daniel Boulud, Charlie Palmer and Waldy Malouf.  Burke's mastery of French culinary technique and his unique American creativity were confirmed at the age of 26, receiving 3 Stars from the New York Times at The River Café.  Burke was then chosen by his peers to represent the US at The International Culinary Competition, where he won France's coveted Meilleurs Ouvriers de France Diplome d’Honneur, the only American to ever achieve this honor.  Burke also won the Nippon Award for Excellence from the government of Japan, for overall skill and technique.  Burke remained Executive Chef at The River Café until 1992.

Career
In 1992, Burke opened the critically acclaimed Park Avenue Café with Smith & Wollensky CEO Alan Stillman, becoming vice president of culinary development for the Smith & Wollensky Restaurant Group four years later.  In 2003, Burke branched out on his own to start his first ever proprietary and highly praised restaurant, davidburke & donatella.   Since then, Burke's wide-ranging and innovative restaurant concepts have included establishments in Chicago, Foxwoods (CT), Las Vegas and Rumson (NJ), as well as New York.  Currently, as the principal of David Burke Hospitality Management, he operates or oversees the culinary direction of 15 restaurants in NC, NJ (where he has seven), NY and Saudi Arabia, eight of which opened during the Covid-19 pandemic between March 2020 and April 2022. Burke stepped beyond the restaurant space with the May 2022 purchase of the 85-year old Dixie Lee Bakery in Keansburg, NJ. Owning a bakery has been a long-held dream of Burke's as a trained pastry chef and alumnus of the prestigious École Lenôtre Pastry School in Plaisir, France    

Over the years, Chef Burke has become one of the most recognized chefs on television, including appearances on two seasons of Top Chef Masters, a guest spot on the Every Day with Rachael Ray show, NBC's TODAY Show, Bloomberg's small-business television series The Mentor, and more. In addition, Burke has published two cookbooks, Cooking With David Burke (1999) and David Burke's New American Classics (2006) co-written by Judith Choate.
01-20-2016

Featured once on Iron Chef America in 2005, he lost by a small margin to Bobby Flay. This show appeared during the second season, the thirteenth episode. The featured ingredient was lamb.
In 2010, Burke was a competitor on the second season of Top Chef Masters, but did not move on to the Champions' Rounds.
Burke also competed on Top Chef Masters Season 5. He was eliminated on Episode 9 in the Teacher Tribute challenge with his Bittersweet Chocolate Soufflé with Orange Peel & Raspberry Sauce.

At the BLT Prime in the Trump International Hotel Washington, D.C., Burke has cooked steak for President Donald Trump, and disputed allegations that the President ate his steak with ketchup. He was rumored to be under consideration for the post of White House Executive Chef, but has stated that he would likely not be interested in the position.

Restaurants
 David Burke Tavern, New York City, October 2016
 Woodpecker by David Burke, New York City, NY, April 2018 
 Drifthouse by David Burke, Seabright New Jersey, April 2018 
 The King Bar and Red Salt Room by David Burke, Garden City Hotel Garden City NY April 2018 
 David Burke Townhouse - (New York City, New York - closed) (Formerly David Burke and Donatella)
 Fishtail - (New York City, New York - closed)
 David Burke at Bloomingdale's - (Bloomingdale's], New York City, New York - closed)
 David Burke Modern American Cuisine - (Las Vegas Valley, Las Vegas, Nevada - closed)
 David Burke's Primehouse - (Chicago, Illinois - closed) 
 Fromagerie - (Rumson, New Jersey - closed)
 Hawaiian Tropic Zone - (New York City, New York - closed)/(Las Vegas, Nevada), Consulting Chef
 restaurant.mc - (Millburn, New Jersey), Consulting Chef
 David Burke Fabrick - (New York City, New York) at The Archer Hotel - closed)
 David Burke Kitchen - (New York City, New York) at The James Hotel 
 David Burke Prime Steakhouse @ Foxwoods Casino  -  Ledyard, Connecticut
 Grillhouse by David Burke - (Schaumburg, IL, Illinois - closed) 
 Burke In The Box (Las Vegas, Nevada) at McCarran International Airport
 ONE CPS, at The Plaza Hotel, New York City; 2000-2004 (closed)
 BLT Prime by David Burke, Trump International Hotel in Washington D.C. September 2016
 Grand Tavern by David Burke, Angad Arts Hotel, Saint Louis, MO 
 David Burke at Orange Lawn, South Orange, NJ - closed)
 Ventanas, Fort Lee, NJ
 1776 on the Green by David Burke, Morristown, NJ 
 The GOAT, Union Beach, NJ
 Red Horse, Rumson, NJ

Awards

Burke has been honored with Japan's Nippon Award of Excellence, the Robert Mondavi Award of Excellence and the CIA's August Escoffier Award.  Nation's Restaurant News named Burke one of the 50 Top R&D Culinarians and Time Out New York named him the "Best Culinary Prankster" in 2003.  In May 2009, the James Beard Foundation inducted Burke into the Who's Who of Food & Beverage in America and Nation's Restaurant News presented him with the Menu Masters award, naming him one of the nation's most celebrated culinary innovators.  In February 2012, Burke was honored by the culinary school at Johnson & Wales University with the Distinguished Visiting Chef Award, which is given to the world's most influential and celebrated chefs.  In November 2012, he was named Restaurateur of the Year by the New Jersey Restaurant Association.  In the same month, he was honored with a Concierge Choice Award, celebrating the elite in New York City hospitality, winning the best chef award.  And in 2013, the David Burke Group was recognized by Restaurant Hospitality magazine as having one of the "Coolest Multiconcept Companies in the Land," a nod to Burke's many original and enviable restaurant concepts.

 1991 Chefs in America - "Chef of the Year"
 1995 Culinary Institute of America -  "Auggie Award"
 1996 & 1997 Robert Mondavi - "Culinary Award of Experience"
 1998 The Vatel Club - "Chef of the Year"
 1998 Chef Magazine - "Chef of the Year"

Products
 As a culinary pioneer, Burke's innovations and revolutionizing techniques appear on menus all over the world, including Pastrami Salmon, flavored oils and tuna tartare, GourmetPops, ready-to-serve cheesecake lollipops.  Additionally, Burke is actively involved with culinology, an approach to food that blends the culinary arts and food technology.  In 2011, Burke received a United States patent for a  process which uses pink Himalayan salt to dry-age steaks. David Burke's Primehouse in Chicago was rated the number one steakhouse in Chicago by Chicago Magazine.
 David Burke Flavor Spray
 Flavor Magic
 David Burke Gourmet Pops

References

External links
Official website

1962 births
Living people
Culinary Institute of America alumni
American male chefs
American chefs
People from Hazlet, New Jersey
American restaurateurs